Mosset Park is a football ground in the town of Forres in the north-east of Scotland, which is the home ground of Highland Football League side Forres Mechanics F.C. It is located on Lea Road in the north of the town and has a capacity of 2,700, with 502 seated.

History

Forres Mechanics' record attendance at Mosset Park came in February 1957 when 7,000 spectators watched the club take on Glasgow Celtic in the fifth round of the Scottish Cup The home side lost 5–0.

The whole ground was moved a very short distance southwards – approximately the width of the pitch – when the A96 was re-routed around Forres and the old main stand, which was then the largest in the league, was lost.

Mosset Park is owned by Moray Council and rented out to the Forres-based football club. The club previously paid rent of £2.50-a-year for the stadium, but following a review in March 2012 it was raised to £4500.

Transport
The nearest railway station to the ground is Forres railway station which is located half a mile south-west of Mosset Park, roughly a 10-minute walk. The station is located on the Aberdeen to Inverness Line.

References

External links
Mosset Park at footballgroundmap.com
Mosset Park at soccerway.com

Highland Football League venues
Sports venues in Moray
Forres Mechanics F.C.
Forres